Kasi Viswanatha Temple is a Hindu temple in Chennai, India. Located at Konnur high road, Ayanavaram, the temple was constructed by the Tawker clan of Madras' Gujarati community and was constructed during the time of the East India Company. The temple is situated close to the Medavakkam Tank Road and adjoining the Ayanavaram Bus Depot.

See also
 Religion in Chennai

References 

 http://www.thehindu.com/society/history-and-culture/the-tawkers-of-madras/article23800735.ece

Hindu temples in Chennai